SS Luther Martin was a Liberty ship built in the United States during World War II. She was named after Luther Martin, a politician and one of the Founding Fathers of the United States, who left the Constitutional Convention early because he felt the Constitution violated States' rights. He was a leading Anti-Federalist, along with Patrick Henry and George Mason, whose actions helped passage of the Bill of Rights.

Construction
Luther Martin was laid down on 8 May 1942, under a Maritime Commission (MARCOM) contract, MCE hull 49, by the Bethlehem-Fairfield Shipyard, Baltimore, Maryland; sponsored by Mrs. Charles A. Swartz, the wife of the B & O Railroad Car inspector at Bethlehem-Fairfield Shipyard, and was launched on 4 July 1942.

History
She was allocated to Agwilines Inc., on 21 July 1942. On 4 June 1948, she was laid up in the National Defense Reserve Fleet, Wilmington, North Carolina. On 15 May 1952, she was laid up in the National Defense Reserve Fleet, Mobile, Alabama. She was sold for scrapping on 7 October 1971, to Union Minerals & Alloys Corp., for $33,127.54. She was withdrawn from the fleet on 27 October 1971.

References

Bibliography

 
 
 
 

 

Liberty ships
Ships built in Baltimore
1942 ships
Mobile Reserve Fleet
Wilmington Reserve Fleet
Ships named for Founding Fathers of the United States